

Events

January

 January 1 – A United Nations-sponsored ceasefire brings an end to the Indo-Pakistani War of 1947. The war results in a stalemate and the division of Kashmir, which still continues as of 2023.
 January 2 – Luis Muñoz Marín becomes the first democratically elected Governor of Puerto Rico.
 January 11 – The first "networked" television broadcasts take place, as KDKA-TV in Pittsburgh, Pennsylvania goes on the air, connecting east coast and mid-west programming in the United States.
 January 16 – Şemsettin Günaltay forms the new government of Turkey. It is the 18th government, last single party government of the Republican People's Party.

 January 17 – The first VW Type 1 to arrive in the United States, a 1948 model, is brought to New York by Dutch businessman Ben Pon. Unable to interest dealers or importers in the Volkswagen, Pon sells the sample car to pay his travel expenses. Only two 1949 models are sold in America that year, convincing Volkswagen chairman Heinrich Nordhoff the car has no future in the U.S. (The Type 1 goes on to become an automotive phenomenon.)
 January 20 – Harry S. Truman is sworn in for a full term, as President of the United States.
 January 25
 The Council for Mutual Economic Assistance (CMEA or COMECON) is established by the Soviet Union and other communist nations.
 In the first Israeli elections, David Ben-Gurion becomes Prime Minister.
 January 26
 Australian citizenship comes into being. 
 c. January 28 – Stalin and antisemitism: The media in the Soviet Union resume a savage propaganda campaign against "rootless cosmopolitans", a euphemism for Soviet Jews, accusing them of being pro-Western and antisocialist.
 January 31 – Forces from the Chinese Communist Party enter Beijing.

February

 February 10 – Arthur Miller's tragedy Death of a Salesman opens at the Morosco Theatre in New York City, and runs for 742 performances.
 February 11 – The London Mozart Players perform their first concert at the Wigmore Hall, London.
 February 13 – António Óscar Carmona is re-elected president of Portugal, for lack of an opposing candidate.
 February 17 – Chaim Weizmann begins his term, as the first President of Israel.
 February 19 – Ezra Pound is awarded the first Bollingen Prize in poetry, by the Bollingen Foundation and Yale University.
 February 22 – Grady the Cow, a 1,200-pound cow, gets stuck inside a silo on a farm in Yukon, Oklahoma, and garners national media attention in the United States.
 February 26 – The Revolutionary Communist Party of India stages attacks at Dum Dum.

March

 March 1
 World heavyweight boxing champion Joe Louis retires.
 Indonesia seizes Yogyakarta from the Dutch.
 March 2 – The B-50 Superfortress Lucky Lady II (under Captain James Gallagher) lands in Fort Worth, Texas, after completing the first non-stop around-the-world airplane flight (it was refueled in flight 4 times).
 March 17 – The Shamrock Hotel in Houston, Texas, owned by oil tycoon Glenn McCarthy, has its grand opening.
 March 20 – The Chicago, Burlington and Quincy, Denver and Rio Grande Western and Western Pacific railroads inaugurate the California Zephyr passenger train between Chicago and Oakland, California, as the first long-distance train to feature Vistadome cars as regular equipment.
 March 21 – WTVJ signs on the air in Miami, Florida, as the first station in the state.
 March 24 – The 21st Academy Awards Ceremony is held. The movie Hamlet wins the Academy Award for Best Picture.
 March 25
 Operation Priboi: An extensive deportation campaign begins in Estonia, Latvia and Lithuania. The Soviet authorities deport more than 92,000 people from the Baltic states to remote areas of the Soviet Union.
 A first issued of weekly magazine Paris Match published in France.
 March 26 – The first half of Giuseppe Verdi's opera Aida, conducted by legendary conductor Arturo Toscanini, and performed in concert (i.e. no scenery or costumes), is telecast by NBC, live from Studio 8H at Rockefeller Center. The second half is telecast a week later. This is the only complete opera that Toscanini ever conducts on television.
 March 28
 United States Secretary of Defense James Forrestal resigns suddenly.
 English astronomer Fred Hoyle coins the term Big Bang during a BBC Third Programme radio broadcast.
 March 30 – The anti-NATO riot takes place, prompted by the decision of the Icelandic parliament to join the newly formed NATO.
 March 31 – The former British colony of Newfoundland joins Canada, as its 10th province.

April

 April 4 – The North Atlantic Treaty is signed in Washington, D.C., creating the NATO defense alliance.
 April 7 – Rodgers and Hammerstein's South Pacific, starring Mary Martin and Ezio Pinza, opens on Broadway, and goes on to become Rodgers and Hammerstein's second longest-running musical. It becomes an instant classic of the musical theatre. The score's biggest hit is the song "Some Enchanted Evening".
 April 8 – Kathy Fiscus, 3 years old, dies from falling down an abandoned well in San Marino, California.
 April 14 – The N'Ko alphabet is completed by Solomana Kante.
 April 15 – KPFA, the flagship station of the Pacifica Foundation, begins broadcasting in Berkeley, California.
 April 18 – The Republic of Ireland formally becomes a republic, and leaves the British Commonwealth.
 April 20 – Royal Navy frigate HMS Amethyst goes up the Yangtze River, to evacuate British Commonwealth refugees escaping the advance of Mao's Communist forces. Under heavy fire, she grounds off Rose Island. Negotiations with the Communists to let the ship leave drag on for weeks, during which time the ship's cat Simon raises the crew's morale.
 April 23 – Chinese Communist troops take Nanjing.
 April 26 – Transjordan changes its name to the Hashemite Kingdom of Jordan.
 April 28
 The 1949 Commonwealth Prime Ministers' Conference issues the London Declaration, enabling India (and, thereafter, any other nation) to remain in the Commonwealth despite becoming a republic, creating the position of 'Head of the Commonwealth' (held by the ruling British monarch), and renaming the organization, from the 'British Commonwealth' to the 'Commonwealth of Nations'.
 Former First Lady of the Philippines Aurora Quezon, 61, is assassinated while en route to dedicate a hospital in memory of her late husband; her daughter and 10 others are also killed.

May

 May 1 – Nereid, a moon of Neptune, is discovered by Gerard Kuiper.
 May 4 – Superga air disaster: A Fiat G.212 airliner of Avio Linee Italiane, carrying the entire Torino F.C. football team, crashes into the back wall of the Basilica of Superga, killing all 31 on board.
 May 5 – The Council of Europe is founded, by the signing of the Treaty of London.
 May 6 – EDSAC, the first practicable stored-program computer, runs its first program at Cambridge University.
 May 9 – Rainier III becomes Prince of Monaco, upon the death of his maternal grandfather Louis II.
 May 11
 Israel is admitted to the United Nations, as its 59th member.
 Siam officially changes its French name to "Thaïlande" (English name to "Thailand"), having officially changed its Thai name to "Prated Thai" since 1939.
 May 12 – Cold War: The Soviet Union lifts the Berlin Blockade.
 May 16 – The Tokyo Stock Exchange resumes operations, after a four-year shutdown.
 May 20
 The AFSA (predecessor of the NSA) is established.
 The Kuomintang regime declares Taiwan under martial law, which lasts until 1987.
 May 22 – After two months in Bethesda Naval Hospital, James Forrestal commits suicide, under circumstances that seem suspicious to many.
 May 23 – The Federal Republic of Germany is established.
 May 31 – The first trial of Alger Hiss for perjury begins in New York City, with Whittaker Chambers as principal witness for the prosecution, but will end in a jury deadlock (8 for, 4 against).

June

 June 5 – Thailand elects Orapin Chaiyakan, the first Thai female member of Thailand's Parliament.
 June 6 – With the passage of the Bodh Gaya Temple Act by the Indian government, Mahabodhi Temple is restored to partial Buddhist control.
 June 7–25 – Dock workers strike in the United Kingdom.
 June 8
 Second Red Scare in the United States: Celebrities including Helen Keller, Dorothy Parker, Danny Kaye, Fredric March, John Garfield, Paul Muni and Edward G. Robinson are named in a Federal Bureau of Investigation report, as Communist Party members.
 George Orwell's dystopian novel Nineteen Eighty-Four is published in London.
 June 14 – Albert II, a rhesus monkey, becomes the first primate to enter space, on U.S. Hermes project V-2 rocket Blossom IVB, but is killed on impact at return.
 June 19 – Glenn Dunaway wins the inaugural NASCAR Cup Series race at Charlotte Speedway, a 3/4 mile oval in Charlotte, North Carolina, but is disqualified due to illegal springs. Jim Roper is declared the official winner.
 June 24 – The first television western, Hopalong Cassidy, airs on NBC in the United States.
 June 29 – Apartheid: The South African Citizenship Act suspends the granting of citizenship to Commonwealth of Nations immigrants after 5 years, and imposes a ban on mixed marriages.

July

 July 1 – The Institute of Chartered Accountants of India is established.
 July 11 – Pamir is the last commercial sailing ship to round Cape Horn, under sail alone.
 July 15 – In an explosion at Prüm in Germany, the town is badly damaged and 12 people die. The explosion crater is one of the largest ever recorded.
 July 19 – The Kingdom of Laos is officially formed, but is not independent from the French Army. 
 July 20 – Israel and Syria sign a truce to end their 19-month war.
 July 24 (St John's Day) – Eruption of the Cumbre Vieja volcano on La Palma begins.
 July 27
 The de Havilland Comet, the world's first jet-powered airliner, makes its first flight, in England.
 Rhodesia beats the New Zealand national rugby union team (the All Blacks) 10–8, in an exhibition match in Bulawayo, the only non-Test nation ever to achieve this feat.
 July 30 – Legal aid in England and Wales begins.
 July 31 – Captain Kerans of HMS Amethyst decides to make a break after nightfall, under heavy fire from the Chinese People's Liberation Army on both sides of the Yangtze River, and successfully rejoins the fleet at Woosung the next day.

August

 August 3 – The Basketball Association of America and the National Basketball League finalize the merger that will create the National Basketball Association.
 August 5 – In Ecuador, the 6.8  Ambato earthquake kills more than 5,000, and destroys a number of villages.
 August 8 – Bhutan signs a Treaty of Friendship with newly independent India, agreeing non-interference in internal affairs, but allowing India to "guide" its foreign policy (similar to the previous arrangements with the British administration in India).
 August 10 – the Avro Canada C102 Jetliner makes its first flight; it is the first jet airliner to fly in North America.
 August 12 – The Fourth Geneva Convention is agreed to.
 August 14
 The Salvatore Giuliano Gang explodes mines under a police barracks, outside Palermo, Sicily.
 A military coup in Syria ousts the president.
 August 21
 The Vatican announces that bones uncovered in its catacombs could be those of the apostle Peter; 19 years later, Pope Paul VI announces confirmation that the bones belong to this first Pope.
Deportivo Saprissa enters Costa Rican soccer's first division.
 The 1949 Queen Charlotte Islands earthquake is Canada's largest earthquake since the 1700 Cascadia earthquake.
 August 24 – The North Atlantic Treaty Organization is established.
 August 29
 The Council of Europe meets for the first time.
 The Soviet Union tests its first atomic bomb, RDS-1 ("Joe 1"). Its design imitates the American plutonium bomb that was dropped on Nagasaki, Japan, in 1945.
 August 31
 The retreat of the Greek Democratic Army to Albania, after its defeat at Mount Grammos, marks the end of the Greek Civil War.
 Six of the last sixteen surviving veterans of the Union Army, in the American Civil War, meet in Indianapolis.

September

 September 2 – Film noir The Third Man, with screenplay by Graham Greene and set in Allied-occupied Vienna, is released in the United Kingdom; it wins the 1949 Grand Prix at the Cannes Film Festival.
 September 6
 Howard Unruh, a World War II veteran, kills 13 neighbors in Camden, New Jersey with a souvenir Parabellum P.08 pistol, to become America's first single-episode mass murderer.
 Allied military authorities relinquish control of former Nazi Germany assets back to Germany.

 September 7 – The Federal Republic of Germany is officially founded. Konrad Adenauer is the first federal chancellor.
 September 9
 Albert Guay affair: A dynamite bomb destroys Canadian Pacific Airlines Douglas DC-3, in Quebec.
 Notorious World War II veteran Edwin Alonzo Boyd commits his first career bank robbery, in Toronto.
 September 13 – The Soviet Union vetoes United Nations membership for Ceylon, Finland, Iceland, Italy, Jordan and Portugal.
 September 17
 Canadian steamship  burns in Toronto Harbour, with the loss of over 118 lives.
 Warner Bros. cartoon, "Fast and Furry-ous" is released. It also marks the debut of Wile E. Coyote and the Road Runner. The director is Chuck Jones (credited as Charles M. Jones).
 September 19 – The United Kingdom government devalues the pound sterling from $4.03 to $2.80, leading to many other currencies being devalued.
 September 23 – U.S. President Harry S. Truman announces that the Soviet Union has tested the atomic bomb.
 September 24 – László Rajk, ex-foreign minister of Hungary, is sentenced to death.
 September 25 – U.S. Christian evangelist Billy Graham starts his Los Angeles Crusade, his first great evangelistic campaign. It runs for eight weeks during which Graham speaks to 350,000 people and the event is subsequently described as the greatest revival since the time of Billy Sunday. After this, Graham becomes a national figure in the United States. 
 September 26 – Samuel Putnam publishes his new translation of Don Quixote, the first in contemporary English. It is instantly acclaimed and is still in print as of 2008.
 September 29
 The First Plenary Session of the Chinese People's Political Consultative Conference approves a design for the Flag of the People's Republic of China.
 Iva Toguri D'Aquino is found guilty in the United States of broadcasting for Japan as "Tokyo Rose" at the end of World War II.

October

 October 1 – The People's Republic of China is officially proclaimed.
 October 2 – The Soviet Union recognizes the People's Republic of China.
 October 3 – Albanian Subversion: First Anglo-American attempt to infiltrate guerillas into Albania; the operation is fatally flawed, by being under the control of double agent Kim Philby.
 October 7 – The German Democratic Republic (East Germany) is officially established.
 October 13 – Severe flooding hits Guatemala.
 October 14 – The Foley Square trial of Eugene Dennis and ten other leaders of the Communist Party USA ends in New York City (the longest trial in U.S. history to this date); all defendants are found guilty and all but one sentenced to five years of prison.
 October 16 – Greek Civil War ends with a communist surrender.
 October 17 – Chinese communist troops take Guangzhou.
 October 20 – China People's Insurance Corporation, as predecessor of China Life was founded.
 October 24 – The cornerstone of the Headquarters of the United Nations on Manhattan is laid.
 October 27
 Battle of Kuningtou: Chinese communist troops fail to take Quemoy; their advance towards Taiwan is halted.
 1949 Air France Lockheed Constellation crash: An Air France flight from Paris to New York crashes in the Azores on São Miguel Island, killing all aboard. Among the victims are violinist Ginette Neveu, and French boxer Marcel Cerdan.

November

 November 7 – Oil is discovered beneath the Caspian Sea, off the coast of the Azerbaijan Soviet Socialist Republic.
 November 12 – The Volkswagen Type 2 panel van is unveiled in Germany.
 November 15 – Nathuram Godse and Narayan Apte are executed for assassinating Mahatma Gandhi.
 November 17 – The second trial of Alger Hiss for perjury begins in New York, again with Whittaker Chambers as principal witness.
 November 24 – The ski resort in Squaw Valley, Placer County, California officially opens.
 November 26 – The Indian Constituent Assembly adopts India's constitution.
 November 28 – Winston Churchill makes a landmark speech in support of the idea of a European Union, at Kingsway Hall, London - but does not see UK as part of it, "The British Government have rightly stated that they cannot commit this country to entering any European Union without the agreement of the other members of the British Commonwealth".

December

 December 7 
 Retreat of the government of the Republic of China to Taiwan finishes, and it declares Taipei its temporary capital city, a status it will retain more than 50 years later.
 The United Nations Relief and Works Agency for Palestine Refugees in the Near East (UNRWA) is established as a United Nations agency.
 December 10 – 1949 Australian federal election: The Liberal/Country Coalition led by Robert Menzies defeats the Labor Government, led by Prime Minister Ben Chifley. Menzies is sworn in on December 19, his second stint as Prime Minister; he will hold the office for over 16 years until his retirement in 1966 and Labor will not win office again until 1972, under Gough Whitlam.
 December 13 – The Knesset votes to move the capital of Israel to Jerusalem.
 December 14 – Traicho Kostov, who until March was acting President of the Council of Ministers of Bulgaria, is sentenced to death for anti-Communist Party activity.
 December 15 – A typhoon strikes a fishing fleet off Korea, killing several thousand.
 December 16 – Sukarno is elected president of the Republic of Indonesia.
 December 17 – Burma recognises the People's Republic of China.
 December 18 – In the American National Football League, the Philadelphia Eagles defeat the Los Angeles Rams 14–0, to win the championship.
 December 27 – The Treaty of The Hague ends the Indonesian National Revolution by recognising transfer of the sovereignty of the Dutch East Indies from Queen Juliana of the Netherlands to the United States of Indonesia; the Susanto Cabinet takes office in the Republic of Indonesia.
 December 29 
 KC2XAK of Bridgeport, Connecticut, becomes the first Ultra high frequency (UHF) television station to operate a daily schedule.
 Smouha SC (sports club) is founded in Alexandria, Egypt, by Joseph Smouha, a Mizrahi Iraqi Jew. 
 December 30 – India recognizes the People's Republic of China.

Date unknown

 The Malta Labour Party is founded.
 The first 20 mm M61 Vulcan Gatling gun prototypes are completed.
 This is the first year in which no African-American is reported lynched in the United States.
 Fernand Braudel's La Méditerranée et le Monde Méditerranéen à l'Epoque de Philippe II is published.
 The Currywurst is invented in Berlin.
 D. R. Kaprekar discovers the convergence property of the number 6174.
 Liebherr, a multinational equipment manufacturer, is founded in Baden-Württemberg, West Germany, to build the mobile tower crane devised by Hans Liebherr.

Births

January

 January 1 
 Ali Kadhim, Iraqi football striker (d. 2018)
 Vehbi Akdağ, Turkish wrestler (d. 2020)
 Max Azria, French fashion designer (d. 2019)
 January 2 
 Nikolai Pankin, Russian breaststroke swimmer, swimming coach (d. 2018)
 Christopher Durang, American playwright
 January 3 – Sylvia Likens, American murder victim (d. 1965)
 January 7 – Chavo Guerrero Sr., American professional wrestler (d. 2017)
 January 8 – Anne Schedeen, American actress
 January 9 – Mary Roos, German singer
 January 10
 George Foreman, African-American boxer
 Linda Lovelace, American porn actress, later anti-porn activist (Deep Throat) (d. 2002)
 January 11 – Daryl Braithwaite, Australian singer 
 January 12
 Ottmar Hitzfeld, German football player, coach
 Haruki Murakami, Japanese author
 Wayne Wang, Hong Kong-born film director
 January 13 – Brandon Tartikoff, American television executive (d. 1997)
 January 14 – Lawrence Kasdan, American director, screenwriter
 January 15 – Panos Mihalopoulos, Greek actor
 January 16 – Caroline Munro, English actress, model
 January 17
 Gyude Bryant, Liberian politician (d. 2014)
 Andy Kaufman, American comedian, actor (Taxi) (d. 1984)
 Mick Taylor, English musician
 January 18 – Philippe Starck, French designer
 January 19
 Robert Palmer, British rock singer ("Addicted to Love") (d. 2003)
 Dennis Taylor, Irish snooker player
 January 20 – Göran Persson, 31st Prime Minister of Sweden
 January 22 – Steve Perry, American rock singer (Journey)
 January 23 – Siti Hardiyanti Rukmana, Indonesian politician and former Minister of Social Affairs
 January 24 
 John Belushi, American actor, comedian (Saturday Night Live) (d. 1982)
 Nikolaus Brender, German television journalist
 January 25 – Paul Nurse, English geneticist, recipient of the Nobel Prize in Physiology or Medicine
 January 26
Nebiha Gueddana, doctor and Tunisian politician
David Strathairn, American actor (Good Night, and Good Luck)
 January 27 – Djavan, Brazilian singer, songwriter
 January 28
 Gregg Popovich, American basketball coach
 Mike Moore, 34th Prime Minister of New Zealand (d. 2020)
 January 29
 Tommy Ramone, Hungarian-American drummer (Ramones) (d. 2014)
 Tommi Salmelainen, Finnish hockey player
 January 30 – Peter Agre, American biologist, recipient of the Nobel Prize in Chemistry
 January 31
 Johan Derksen, Dutch footballer, sports journalist
 Ken Wilber, American philosopher

February

 February 1 – Joan Burton, Irish politician
 February 2
 Duncan Bannatyne, Scottish entrepreneur
 Brent Spiner, American actor, comedian and singer (Star Trek: The Next Generation)
 February 3 – Hennie Kuiper, Dutch cyclist
 February 4 – Rasim Delić, Bosnian military chief of staff and convicted war criminal (d. 2010)
 February 6 – Jim Sheridan, Irish film director
 February 7 – Joe English, American drummer
 February 8 
 Brooke Adams, American actress
 Florinda Meza, Mexican actress, television producer, and screenwriter (best known as Doña Florinda in El Chavo del Ocho)
 February 9 – Judith Light, American actress
 February 10 – Maxime Le Forestier, French singer
 February 15 – Ken Anderson, American NFL player
 February 16 – Lyn Paul, English singer
 February 17 – Dennis Green, American football coach (d. 2016)
 February 18
Pat Fraley, American voice actor, voice-over teacher
 Gary Ridgway, American serial killer
 February 19 – Danielle Bunten Berry, American computer game designer (d. 1998)
 February 21 
 Jerry Harrison, American songwriter
 Ronnie Hellström, Swedish footballer (d. 2022)
 February 22 – Niki Lauda, Austrian triple Formula 1 world champion (d. 2019)
 February 25 – Ric Flair, American professional wrestler
 February 26 – Simon Crean, Australian politician
 February 28 – Ilene Graff, American actress, singer

March

 March 2
 Gates McFadden, American actress, choreographer
 J.P.R. Williams, Welsh rugby player
 Dinesh Gunawardena, Sri Lankan politician, 15th Prime Minister of Sri Lanka
 March 3 
 Elijah Harper, Canadian Aboriginal activist (d. 2013)
 Gloria Hendry, African-American actress
 Jesse Jefferson, American baseball player (d. 2011) 
 March 4 – Helen Frost, American writer
 March 5 – Franz Josef Jung, German politician
 March 6
 Shaukat Aziz, Prime Minister of Pakistan
 Martin Buchan, Scottish footballer
 March 7 
 Rex Hunt, Australian television and radio personality
 Ghulam Nabi Azad, Indian politician
 March 8 – Cho Yang-ho, South Korean businessman (d. 2019)
 March 9 
 Kalevi Aho, Finnish composer
 Tapani Kansa, Finnish singer
 March 10
 Barbara Corcoran, American businesswoman, investor, and television personality
 Nobu Matsuhisa, Japanese chef
 March 11 – Georg Schramm, German psychologist, Kabarett artist
 March 12
 Rob Cohen, American film director, producer and writer
 Natalia Kuchinskaya, Soviet gymnast
 Mike Gibbins, Welsh drummer (d. 2005)
 March 13 – Julia Migenes, American soprano
 March 16
 Erik Estrada, American actor, police officer (CHiPs)
 Victor Garber, Canadian actor (Godspell, Alias)
 Elliott Murphy, American singer, songwriter
 March 17
 Patrick Duffy, American actor (Dallas)
 Pat Rice, Irish footballer, football manager
 March 18 – Alex Higgins, Northern Irish snooker player (d. 2010)
 March 19
Hirofumi Hirano, Japanese politician, Chief Cabinet Secretary
 Valery Leontiev, Soviet and Russian actor and singer
 March 20 – Marcia Ball, American blues musician
 March 21 
 Eddie Money, American rock guitarist, singer (Two Tickets to Paradise) (d. 2019)
 Slavoj Žižek, Slovenian philosopher
 March 22 – Fanny Ardant, French actress
 March 24
 Nick Lowe, English pop singer
 Ranil Wickremesinghe, 9th President of Sri Lanka, 10th Prime Minister of Sri Lanka
 March 25 – Sue Klebold, American activist
 March 26
 Jon English, English-born Australian singer, songwriter and actor (d. 2016)
 Rudi Koertzen, South African cricket umpire (d. 2022)
 Vicki Lawrence, American comedian, game show hostess (The Carol Burnett Show)
 Margareta of Romania, Romanian princess and diplomat
 Giuseppe Sabadini, Italian footballer
 Patrick Süskind, German writer
 March 28 
 Ronnie Ray Smith, American Olympic athlete (d. 2013)
 Michael W. Young, American geneticist, chronobiologist and recipient of the Nobel Prize in Physiology or Medicine
 March 29 – Michael Brecker, American jazz musician (d. 2007)
 March 30 – Lene Lovich, American singer

April

 April 1
 Gérard Mestrallet, French businessman
 Sammy Nelson, Northern Irish footballer
 Gil Scott-Heron, American musician, composer and activist (d. 2011)
 April 2 – Pamela Reed, American actress
 April 3 – Richard Thompson, English musician, songwriter
 April 4 – Parveen Babi, Bollywood actress (d. 2005)
April 5 – Judith Resnik, American Astronaut (Challenger Disaster) (d. 1986)
 April 6 – Horst Ludwig Störmer, German-born physicist, Nobel Prize laureate
 April 7
 Mitch Daniels, American academic administrator, businessman, author, and politician
 Zygmunt Zimowski, Polish bishop (d. 2016)
 April 8 
 Alex Fergusson, Scottish politician (d. 2018)
 Brenda Russell, American-Canadian singer, songwriter and keyboardist
 Fanie de Jager, South African operatic tenor
 April 9 - William O’Neal, American FBI informant (d. 1990)
April 10 – Daniel Mangeas, French bicycle commentator
 April 11 – Bernd Eichinger, German film producer, director (d. 2011)
 April 13 – Christopher Hitchens, English-American writer (d. 2011)
 April 14 – John Shea, American actor
 April 15
 Alla Pugacheva, Russian musical performer
 Aleksandra Ziółkowska-Boehm, Polish-born writer
 April 16 – Sandy Hawley, Canadian jockey
 April 18
 Antônio Fagundes, Brazilian actor
 Geoff Bodine, American race car driver
 Bengt Holmström, Finnish-born economist, Nobel Prize laureate
 April 19 – Sergey Nikolayevich Volkov, Russian figure skater (d. 1990)
 April 20
 Massimo D'Alema, 53rd Prime Minister of Italy
 Veronica Cartwright, English-born American actress
 Jessica Lange, American actress
 April 21 – Patti LuPone, American actress
 April 22 – Spencer Haywood, American basketball player
 April 23
 Joyce DeWitt, American actress
 György Gedó, Hungarian Olympic boxer
 John Miles, English rock music vocalist, guitarist and keyboardist (d. 2021)
 April 24 – Véronique Sanson, French singer, songwriter
 April 26 – Jerry Blackwell, American professional wrestler (d. 1995)
 April 28 – Bruno Kirby, American actor (d. 2006)
 April 30 – António Guterres, Prime Minister of Portugal, 9th Secretary-General of the United Nations

May

 May 1 – Gavin Christopher, American singer (d. 2016)
 May 2 – Alan Titchmarsh, English gardener
 May 3 – Leopoldo Luque, Argentine soccer player (d. 2021)
 May 4 – John Force, American race car driver
 May 9 
 Billy Joel, American singer, songwriter and pianist
 Ibrahim Baré Maïnassara, military President of Niger (d. 1999)
 May 10 – Mahfuzur Rahman Khan, Bangladeshi cinematographer (d. 2019)
 May 13 – Zoë Wanamaker, American-British actress
 May 14 – Sverre Årnes, Norwegian writer
 May 16 – Rick Reuschel, American professional baseball player
 May 18
 Joseph R. Cistone, American Catholic prelate (d. 2018)
 Rick Wakeman, English rock musician, songwriter
 Bill Wallace, Canadian rock musician (The Guess Who)
 May 19
 Dusty Hill, American bassist (ZZ Top) (d. 2021)
 Archie Manning, former American football player, father of Peyton and Eli Manning
 Ashraf Ghani, President of Afghanistan
 May 20 – Dave Thomas, Canadian actor, comedian (Second City Television)
 May 21 – Andrew Neil, Scottish journalist and broadcaster
 May 22 
 Chris Butler, American musician, songwriter (The Waitresses)
 Jesse Lee Peterson, American radio show host and religious minister 
 May 23 – Alan García, President of Peru (d. 2019)
 May 24
 Jim Broadbent, English actor
 Tomaž Pisanski, Slovenian mathematician
 May 25 – Jamaica Kincaid, Antiguan-born novelist
 May 26
 Ward Cunningham, American computer programmer
 Jeremy Corbyn, British politician
 Pam Grier, African-American actress
 Arlene Klasky, American animator
 Philip Michael Thomas, African-American actor (Miami Vice)
 Hank Williams, Jr., American country singer
 May 27
 Jo Ann Harris, American actress
 Alma Guillermoprieto, Mexican journalist
 May 28 
 Shelley Hamlin, American professional golfer (d. 2018)
 Martin Kelner, British journalist, author, comedian, singer, actor and radio presenter
 Susan Fitzgerald, Irish actress (d. 2013)
 May 29 
 Francis Rossi, English rock guitarist, singer (Status Quo)
 Robert Axelrod, American voice actor (Mighty Morphin Power Rangers) (d. 2019)
 May 30 – Bob Willis, English cricketer (d. 2019)
 May 31 – Tom Berenger, American actor (Platoon)

June

 June 1 
 Déwé Gorodey, New Caledonian writer and politician (d. 2022)
 Mu Tiezhu, Chinese basketball player, coach (d. 2008)
 June 2
 Alan Brinkley, American historian (d. 2019)
 Heather Couper, British astronomer (d. 2020)
 June 4 – Mark B. Cohen, Pennsylvania legislative leader
 June 7 – Wendy Sherman, American diplomat and politician
 June 8 – Emanuel Ax, Polish-born American pianist
 June 10
 Kevin Corcoran, American child actor, television director, film producer (d. 2015)
 Bora Dugić, Serbian musician, flautist
 Daniele Formica, Irish-Italian actor, director and playwright (d. 2011)
Frankie Faison, American actor 
 June 11 – Frank Beard, American drummer (ZZ Top)
 June 13 
 Ann Druyan, American popular science writer, wife of Carl Sagan
 Red Symons, English-Australian musician, television, and radio personality 
 June 14
 Carlos María Abascal, Mexican lawyer, Former Secretary of the Interior of Mexico and son of Salvador Abascal, (d. 2008)
 Antony Sher, South African-born British actor (d. 2021)
 Harry Turtledove, American historian, novelist
 Papa Wemba, Congolese soukous musician (d. 2016)
 Alan White, English drummer and songwriter (Yes)
 June 15
 Russell Hitchcock, English singer, musician (Air Supply)
 Jim Varney, American actor and comedian (Ernest Goes to Camp) (d. 2000)
 June 16 – Robbin Thompson, American singer, songwriter (d. 2015)
 June 18
 Jarosław Kaczyński, Prime Minister of Poland
 Lech Kaczyński, President of Poland (d. 2010)
 Lincoln Thompson, Jamaican musician (d. 1999)
 June 19 
Ebi, Iranian singer
Hassan Shehata, Egyptian footballer and coach
 June 20
 Gotabaya Rajapaksa, 8th President of Sri Lanka
 Lionel Richie, African-American urban musician (Commodores)
 June 21
 John Agard, Guyanese poet, playwright and children's writer
 Clifford Brooks, American Football defensive back
 Derek Emslie, Lord Kingarth, Scottish judge
 Shane Molloy, Australian rules footballer
 Stuart Pearson, English football player
 Jane Urquhart, Canadian author
 June 22
 Aytaç Arman, Turkish actor (d. 2019)
 Larry Junstrom, American rock bassist (d. 2019)
 Alan Osmond, American pop singer
 Meryl Streep, American actress
 Lindsay Wagner, American actress
 Elizabeth Warren, American academic and politician, U.S. Senator (D-Mass.) since 2013
 June 23
 Dave Goltz, American professional baseball player
 Gail Harris, United States Navy officer
 Charles Ho, Hong Kong pro-Beijing[3] businessman
 Jon McLachlan, New Zealand rugby union player
 June 24
 Billy Moeller, Australian professional feather/super feather/light/light welter/welterweight boxer
 Agenor Muniz, Brazilian-born footballer
 Hector Thompson, Australian professional light/light welter/welter/light middleweight boxer (d. 2020)
 June 25
 Dan Barker, American atheist activist
 Phyllis George, American businesswoman, actress and sportscaster (d. 2020)
 Kene Holliday, American actor
 Lalith Kaluperuma, Sri Lankan test cricketer and ODI cricketer
 Brenda Sykes, American actress
 Patrick Tambay, French racing driver (d. 2022)
 John Taylor, English professional footballer
 Yoon Joo-sang, South Korean actor
 June 26
 Adrian Gurvitz, English singer-songwriter and musician 
 Graco Ramírez, governor of Morelos, Mexico 2012-2018
 Avtar Singh Kang, Punjabi singer and folk contributor
 Arturo Vázquez Ayala, Mexican footballer
 June 27
 Brent Berk, American competition swimmer, Olympic athlete
 Stephen Rucker, American composer 
 Vera Wang, American fashion designer
 June 28
 Don Baylor, American Major League Baseball (MLB) player, coach and manager (d. 2017)
 Clarence Davis, American football running back
 Kevin McLeod, Australian rules footballer
 Tom Owens, American professional basketball player
 June 29
 Dan Dierdorf, American football offensive lineman, later sportscaster
 Joe Moore, American football running back
 Henri Proglio, French businessman
 A. Anwhar Raajhaa, Indian politician
 Lisette Sevens, Dutch field hockey defender
 June 30
 Silvio Aquino, Salvadoran football player
 Uwe Kliemann, German football player and coach
 Norm Mitchell, Australian rules footballer
 Andy Scott, Welsh singer, songwriter and guitarist
 Philippe Toussaint, Belgium's most successful golfers
 Bogdan Turudija, Serbian football player

July

 July 1
 Rosa Elena Galván Valles, Mexican politician
 Yoshihide Fukao, Japanese volleyball player
 Seninho, Portuguese-Angolan footballer (d. 2020)
 Néjia Ben Mabrouk, Tunisian screenwriter, director
 John Farnham, Australian singer, recording artist and entertainer
 July 2 
 David Eaton, American composer, conductor and producer
 Abderrahmane Benkhalfa, Algerian financial expert (d. 2021)
 José Manuel Díaz Medina, Mexican politician
 Ben Verbong, Dutch film director, screenwriter
 July 3
 Mircea Chelaru, Romanian general and politician
 Jan Smithers, American actress
 Alfred Vierling, Dutch politician
 Johnnie Wilder, Jr., American vocalist (d. 2006)
 July 4 – Horst Seehofer, German conservative politician
 July 5
 Ed O'Ross, American actor
 Susan P. Graber, American attorney, jurist
 Jill Murphy, British author and illustrator (d. 2021)
 July 6 
 Noli de Castro, Filipino broadcast journalist, radio commentator and Vice President of the Philippines
 Phyllis Hyman, American singer, actress (d. 1995)
 Grant McAuley, New Zealand rower
 July 7 
 Shelley Duvall, American actress
 John Lippiett, British senior Royal Navy officer
 Monte Cater, American football coach
 July 8
 Jan Elvheim, Norwegian politician
 Jaroslav Jurka, Czech fencer
 Wolfgang Puck, Austrian-American celebrity chef, restaurateur, and occasional actor
 Carmel Cryan, English actress
 Dale Hoganson, Canadian ice hockey player
 July 9
 Raoul Cédras, former president of Haiti
 Jesse Duplantis, American televangelist
 Nigel Lythgoe, English television producer, personality
 Ali Akbar Abdolrashidi, Iranian intellectual, journalist, writer, traveler, translator, and university lecturer
 July 11
 Liona Boyd, English classical guitarist
 Émerson Leão, Brazilian footballer
 Ingrid Newkirk, English-born American-based animal rights activist
 Phil Braidwood, Manx politician
 July 13 – Helena Fibingerová, Czech athlete
 July 15
 Carl Bildt, 28th Prime Minister of Sweden, Minister for Foreign Affairs
 Trevor Horn, English pop singer, producer
 Mohammed bin Rashid Al Maktoum, 3rd Prime Minister of the United Arab Emirates
 July 17
 Geezer Butler, English heavy metal bassist (Black Sabbath)
 William C. Faure, South African film director (d. 1994)
 Andrei Fursenko, Russian politician, scientist and businessman
 Charley Steiner, American sportscaster
 July 19
 Kgalema Motlanthe, South African politician, President of South Africa
 Daniel Vaillant, French Socialist politician
 July 20 – Naseeruddin Shah, Indian actor and environmentalist
 July 21 – Tengku Azlan, Malaysian politician
 July 22
 Alan Menken, American composer
 Lasse Virén, Finnish long-distance runner
 July 24
 Michael Richards, American actor, comedian (Seinfeld)
 Joan Enric Vives Sicília, Spanish archbishop
 July 25 – Francis Smerecki, French football player, manager (d. 2018)
 July 26
 Thaksin Shinawatra, Prime Minister of Thailand and businessman
 Roger Taylor, English rock musician (Queen)
 July 28 – Vida Blue, American baseball player
 July 29 – Jamil Mahuad, President of Ecuador
 July 31
 Mike Jackson, American basketball player
 Susan Bennett, American voice-over artist

August

 August 1 – Mugur Isărescu, 58th prime minister of Romania
 August 4 – John Riggins, American football player
 August 6 – Alan Campbell, Northern Irish cleric  (d. 2017)
 August 7 – Walid Jumblatt, leader of the Lebanese Druze
 August 8
 Terry Burnham, American actress
 Keith Carradine, American actor
 August 9
 Slavko Ćuruvija, Serbian journalist, newspaper publisher (d. 1999)
 Ted Simmons, American baseball player
 August 11
 Ian Charleson, British actor (d. 1990)
 Sandra Lee Scheuer, Kent State University shooting victim (d. 1970)
 August 12
 Fernando Collor de Mello, 32nd President of Brazil
 Mark Essex, American mass murderer (d. 1973)
 Mark Knopfler, British rock guitarist (Dire Straits)
 August 13
 Philippe Petit, French high-wire artist
 Pete Visclosky, American Politician
 August 14 – Morten Olsen, Danish football player, manager 
 August 15 
 Beverly Burns, American pilot, first woman in the world to captain the Boeing 747
 Phyllis Smith, American actress
 August 16 – Barbara Goodson, American voice actress
 August 17 – Sue Draheim, American fiddler (d. 2013)
 August 20 – Phil Lynott, Irish rock musician (d. 1986)
 August 21
 Loretta Devine, African-American actress
 Daniel Sivan, Israeli professor
 Keetie van Oosten-Hage, Dutch cyclist
 August 22 – Diana Nyad, American author
 August 23
 William Lane Craig, Christian philosopher
 Shelley Long, American actress (Cheers)
 Rick Springfield, Australian rock singer, actor
 Leslie Van Houten, American criminal, Manson Family member
 August 24
 Anna Lee Fisher, American astronaut, chemist and physician
 Charles Rocket, American actor (Saturday Night Live) (d. 2005)
 August 25
 Willy Rey, Dutch-Canadian model (d. 1973)
 Martin Amis, English novelist
 Gene Simmons, Israeli-American rock musician (Kiss)
 August 26 – Leon Redbone, Canadian-American singer, songwriter, actor, voice actor, and guitarist (d. 2019)
 August 28
 Martin Lamble, British folk rock musician (d. 1969)
 Svetislav Pešić, Serbian basketball player, coach
 August 29 – Stan Hansen, American professional wrestler
 August 30 – Peter Maffay, German singer
 August 31
 Richard Gere, American actor (American Gigolo)
 H. David Politzer, American physicist, Nobel Prize laureate

September

 

 September 1
 Fidel Castro Díaz-Balart, Cuban nuclear physicist, government official (d. 2018) 
 Leslie Feinberg, American transgender activist (d. 2014) 
 Tan Soo Khoon, Former Speaker of the Parliament of Singapore 
 September 7 - Lee McGeorge Durrell, American author, television presenter, and zookeeper
 September 9
 John Curry, British figure skater (d. 1994) 
 Alain Mosconi, French swimmer, Olympic medalist and previous world record holder
 Daniel Pipes, American historian, writer, and commentator
 Joe Theismann, American football player
 Susilo Bambang Yudhoyono, 6th president of Indonesia
 September 10 – Bill O'Reilly, American conservative radio and television commentator
 September 13 – John W. Henry, American foreign exchange advisor, Boston Red Sox owner
 September 14
 Ed King, American musician (Lynyrd Skynyrd)(d. 2018)
 Steve Gaines, American guitarist (Lynyrd Skynyrd) (d. 1977)
 Eikichi Yazawa, Japanese singer
 September 15 – Joe Barton, American politician
 September 16 
 Ed Begley Jr., American actor, environmentalist (St. Elsewhere)
 Chrisye, Indonesian singer (d. 2007)
 September 17 – Didith Reyes, Filipina singer (d. 2008)
 September 18
 Mo Mowlam, British politician (d. 2005)
 Peter Shilton, English goalkeeper
 September 19 
 Twiggy, English model
 Ernie Sabella, American actor
 Barry Scheck, American attorney and author
 Richard Rogler, German Kabarett artist, professor of Kabarett at the University of the Arts in Berlin
 September 21 – Artis Gilmore, American basketball player
 September 23 – Bruce Springsteen, American singer, songwriter (Born in the USA)
 September 25 
 Inshan Ali, West Indian cricketer (d. 1995)
 Pedro Almodóvar, Spanish filmmaker, director, screenwriter, producer, and actor
 Ronaldo Caiado, Brazilian politician
 September 26 – Jane Smiley, American novelist
 September 27
 Mike Schmidt, American baseball player
 Jahn Teigen, Norwegian singer (d. 2020)
 September 29 – Wenceslao Selga Padilla, Filipino scheut priest (d. 2018)

October

 

 October 1
 Isaac Bonewits, American author, occultist (d. 2010)
 Su Chi, Taiwanese politician
 October 2
 Richard Hell, American musician, writer
 Annie Leibovitz, American photographer
 October 3 – Svika Pick, Israeli musician
 October 4 
 Armand Assante, American actor (Gotti)
 Lindsey Buckingham, American musician
 Luis Sepúlveda, Chilean writer and journalist (d. 2020)
 October 6 – Bobby Farrell, West Indian-born Dutch dancer (Boney M.) (d. 2010)
 October 7 – Ronnie Mund, American television personality
 October 8 
 Chris Dobson, British chemist (d. 2019)
 Jerry Bittle, American cartoonist (d. 2003)
 Sigourney Weaver, American actress (Alien)
 Mark Hopkinson, American mass murderer (d. 1992)
 October 9 – Rod Temperton, English songwriter, record producer and musician (d. 2016)
 October 10
 Michel Létourneau, Canadian politician (d. 2019)
 Jessica Harper, American actress, producer
 October 12
 Randy Kryn, Civil Rights Movement historian
Carlos the Jackal, Venezuelan-born international terrorist 
 October 13 – Rick Vito, American musician
 October 14 – Katha Pollitt, American writer
 October 17
 Owen Arthur, 5th Prime Minister of Barbados (d. 2020)
 Bill Hudson, American musician and actor
 Dean Shek, Hong Kong actor (d. 2021)
 October 20 
 Valeriy Borzov, Ukrainian athlete
 George Harris, British actor
 October 21
 LaTanya Richardson, African-American actress, producer
 Benjamin Netanyahu, 2-time prime minister of Israel
 October 22 
 Stiv Bators, American singer (The Dead Boys) (d. 1990)
 Arsène Wenger, French football (soccer) manager
 October 26 – Antonio Carpio, Filipino Supreme Court jurist
 October 27 
 Cheryl Keeton, American murder victim (d. 1986)
 Emanuel Barbara, Maltese bishop (d. 2018)
 October 28 – Caitlyn Jenner, American transgender track and field athlete, reality star
 October 29 – Paul Orndorff, American professional wrestler (d. 2021)
 October 30
 Pramod Mahajan, Indian politician, strategist (d. 2006)
 Terri Dial, American banker (d. 2012)

November

 November 1
 Jeannie Berlin, American film actress
 David Foster, Canadian musician, record producer, composer, singer, songwriter and arranger
 Belita Moreno, American film actress
 November 2
 Marc Elrich, American politician
 November 3
 Mike Evans, African-American actor (d. 2006)
 Larry Holmes, African-American boxer
 Anna Wintour, British-American fashion journalist, editor in-chief of the magazine Vogue
 November 5
 Armin Shimerman, American actor
 Jimmie Spheeris, American singer, songwriter (d. 1984)
 November 6 – Joseph C. Wilson, United States diplomat (d. 2019)
 November 7
 Aiswarya, Queen of Nepal (d. 2001)
 Judi Bari, American environmental activist (d. 1997)
 Guillaume Faye, French journalist and writer (d. 2019)
Judy Tenuta, American comedienne (d. 2022)
 November 8 – Bonnie Raitt, American singer, guitarist
 November 11 – Ismail Petra of Kelantan, sultan of Kelantan (d. 2019)
 November 14 – Paola Balducci, Italian politician, lawyer
 November 15 – David Rubinstein, American pianist, composer
 November 17 – John Boehner, Speaker of the United States House of Representatives 
 November 18 – Ahmed Zaki, Egyptian actor (d. 2005)
 November 19 – Ahmad Rashad, American sportscaster, television personality
 November 20 – Jeff Dowd, American film producer and political activist
 November 21 – Ignazio Visco, Italian economist, Governor of the Bank of Italy
 November 22
 Shaun Garnett, English footballer, coach
 David Pietrusza, American author, historian
 November 23
 Pat Condell, English comedian, internet personality
 Marcia Griffiths, Jamaican singer
 November 24
 Nick Ainger, British politician
 Pierre Buyoya, former President of Burundi (d. 2020)
 Linda Tripp, Key figure in the Clinton-Lewinsky scandal (d. 2020)
 November 25
 Mike Joy, NASCAR commentator
 Kerry O'Keeffe, Australian cricketer, commentator
 GT Devegowda, Indian politician
 November 26
 Shlomo Artzi, Israeli singer
 Juanin Clay, American actress (d. 1995)
 November 27 – Marcel Reif, Swiss television sport journalist
 November 28
 Alexander Godunov, Russian-born dancer, actor (d. 1995)
 Paul Shaffer, Canadian-American musician
 Siringan Gubat, Malaysian politician (d. 2018)
 November 29
 Jerry Lawler, American professional wrestler and commentator
 Stan Rogers, Canadian musician (d. 1983)
 Garry Shandling, American comedian (d. 2016)
 November 30 – Nicholas Woodeson, English actor

December

 December 1
 Pablo Escobar, Colombian drug lord (d. 1993)
 Sebastián Piñera, Chilean businessman, politician and 36th and 38th President of Chile
 Kurt Schmoke, African-American Dean, Howard Law School, Mayor of Baltimore
 December 2 – Ron Raines, American actor
 December 3
 John Akii-Bua, Ugandan hurdler (d. 1997)
 Heather Menzies, Canadian-American actress (The Sound of Music, Logan's Run) (d. 2017)
 December 4
 Jeff Bridges, American actor
 Pamela Stephenson, New Zealand-born comedian, actress, and singer
 December 5
 Bruce E. Melnick, American astronaut
 Lanny Wadkins, American professional golfer
 December 6
 Doug Marlette, American editorial cartoonist (d. 2007)
 Peter Willey, English cricketer
 December 7
 James Rivière, Italian jeweler, designer
 Tom Waits, American singer, composer, and actor
 Cathy Wayne, Australian pop entertainer (d. 1969)
 December 8 – Mary Gordon, American writer
 December 9
 Eileen Myles, American poet and writer
 Jairo Varela, Colombian composer (d. 2012)
 December 10 – Dick Cohen, American politician, Minnesota Senate
 December 11 – Boris Shcherbakov, Russian-Soviet film actor
 December 12 – Bill Nighy, English actor
 December 13
 Robert Lindsay, English actor
 Randy Owen, American country lead vocalist, rhythm guitar player
 Tom Verlaine, American rock singer, guitarist (d. 2023)
 December 14 – Bill Buckner, American baseball player (d. 2019)
 December 15
 Don Johnson, American actor (Miami Vice)
 Abdul Karim Al-Kabariti, Prime Minister of Jordan
 December 16 – Billy Gibbons, American guitarist (ZZ Top)
 December 17 
 Dušan Mitošević, Serbian football player, manager (d. 2018)
 Paul Rodgers, British rock singer
 December 18 – David A. Johnston, American volcanologist (d. 1980)
Blaze Foley, American country singer and songwriter (d. 1989)
 December 19
 Carlos Gomes Júnior, Bissau-Guinean politician 
 Sebastian, Danish musician
 December 20 
 Pauline Robinson Bush, eldest daughter of President of the United States George H. W. Bush and his wife First Lady Barbara Bush (d. 1953)
 Claudia Jennings, American model (d. 1979)
 December 21 – Thomas Sankara, 2-Time President of Burkina Faso (d. 1987)
 December 22
 Michael Bacon, American singer-songwriter
 Maurice Gibb, British rock musician (Bee Gees) (d. 2003)
 Robin Gibb, British rock musician (Bee Gees) (d. 2012)
 December 23 – Brian O'Neill, American political leader
 December 24 – Randy Neugebauer, American politician
 December 25
 Simone Bittencourt de Oliveira, Brazilian singer
 Sissy Spacek, American actress (Carrie)
 Manny Mori, former president of Micronesia
 Joe Louis Walker, American musician
 Nawaz Sharif, Pakistani prime minister
 December 26 – José Ramos-Horta, President of East Timor, recipient of the Nobel Peace Prize
 December 27 – Klaus Fischer, German footballer
 December 28 
 Barbara De Fina, American film producer
 Sam Katz, American politician, Philadelphia
 December 29 – Syed Kirmani, Indian cricketer
 December 30 – Jerry Coyne, American biologist
 December 31 – Ellen Datlow, American science fiction writer

Date unknown
 Michael Houghton, British-born virologist, recipient of the Nobel Prize in Physiology or Medicine
 Boutros Romhein, Syrian sculptor
 Bakri Hassan Saleh, 12th prime minister of Sudan

Deaths

January

 January 6 
 Victor Fleming, American director (b. 1889)
 Gennaro Righelli, Italian actor, director and screenwriter (b. 1886)
 January 7
 José Ramos Preto, Portuguese jurist, politician and 75th Prime Minister of Portugal (b. 1870)
 Suehiko Shiono, Japanese lawyer, politician and cabinet minister (b. 1880)
 January 8 – Yoshijirō Umezu, Japanese general (b. 1882)
 January 9 
 Martin Grabmann, German Catholic priest, mediaevalist and historian (b. 1875)
 Tommy Handley, British radio comedian (b. 1892)
 Tom Longboat, Canadian Olympic runner (b. 1887)
January 10 - Erich von Drygalski, German geographer (b. 1865)
 January 11 – Nelson Doubleday, American publisher (b. 1889)
 January 13 – Eduardo Barron, Spanish engineer, pilot (b. 1888)
 January 14
 Juan Bielovucic, Peruvian aviator (b. 1889)
 Harry Stack Sullivan, American psychiatrist (b. 1892)
 Joaquín Turina, Spanish composer (b. 1882)
 January 15 – Charles Ponzi, Italian-born American con man (b. 1882)
 January 19 – William Wright, American actor (b. 1911)
 January 21 – Joseph Cawthorn, American actor (b. 1868)
 January 22 
 Henry Mond, 2nd Baron Melchett, British industrialist, politician (b. 1898)
 Henry Slocum, American tennis player (b. 1862)
 January 23 – Erich Klossowski, German-born Polish historian, painter (b. 1875)
 January 28 – Jean-Pierre Wimille, French race car driver (b. 1908)
 January 31 – Henri De Vries, Dutch actor (b. 1864)

February

 February 1 – Herbert Stothart, American composer (b. 1885)
 February 2 
 Pedro Paulo Bruno, Brazilian painter, singer, poet and landscaper (b. 1888)
 Theodoros Natsinas, Greek teacher (b. 1872)
 February 3 – Carlos Obligado, Argentine poet, critic and writer (b. 1889)
 February 6
 Hiroaki Abe, Japanese admiral (b. 1889)
Ulrich Greifelt, German SS general of police (b. 1896)
 February 10 
 Charles Vane-Tempest-Stewart, 7th Marquess of Londonderry, British politician (b. 1878)
 Francesco Ticciati, Italian composer, pianist, teacher and lecturer (b. 1893)
 February 11 – Giovanni Zenatello, Italian opera singer (b. 1876)
 February 12 – Hassan al-Banna, Egyptian founder of the Muslim Brotherhood (b. 1906) (assassinated)
 February 14 – Fernand Desprès, French shoemaker, anarchist, journalist and activist (b. 1879)
 February 15 
 Charles L. Bartholomew, American cartoonist (b. 1869)
 Patricia Ryan, British-born American actress (b. 1921)
 February 16 – Umberto Brunelleschi, Italian artist (b. 1879)
 February 18 – Niceto Alcalá-Zamora, Spanish lawyer, politician and 6th President of Spain (b. 1877)
 February 19 – Fidelio Ponce de León, Cuban painter (b. 1895)
 February 21 – Tan Malaka, Indonesian teacher, philosopher, founder of Struggle Union and Murba Party, guerilla and fighter (b. 1897)
 February 22 – Félix d'Herelle, French-Canadian microbiologist (b. 1873)
 February 25 – Juan Sinforiano Bogarín, Paraguayan clergyman, Roman Catholic archbishop (b. 1863)

March

 March 2 – Sarojini Naidu, Indian independence activist, poet (b. 1879)
 March 3 – Carrie Ashton Johnson, American editor, author (b. 1863)
 March 4 – James Rowland Angell, American psychologist and educator (b. 1869)
 March 7 – Bradbury Robinson, American who threw the first forward pass in American football history (b. 1884)
 March 9 – Prince Philip of Bourbon-Two Sicilies (b. 1885)
 March 10 – Alphonse Hustache, French entomologist (b. 1872)
 March 11
 Anastasios Charalambis, Greek general, interim Prime Minister of Greece (b. 1862)
 Henri Giraud, French general (b. 1879)
 Joan Lamote de Grignon, Spanish pianist, composer (b. 1872)
 March 12 – August Bier, German surgeon (b. 1861)
 March 15 – Gheorghe Brăescu, Romanian writer (b. 1871)
 March 16 – Leyland Hodgson, British-born American actor (b. 1892)
 March 17 – Felix Bressart, German-born American actor (b. 1892)
 March 19 – Sir James Somerville, British admiral (b. 1882)
 March 25 
 Prince August Wilhelm of Prussia (b. 1887)
 Jack Kapp, president of the U.S. branch of Decca Records (b. 1901)
 March 27 
 Elisheva Bikhovski, Soviet-born Israeli poet, writer and translator (b. 1888)
 March 28 
 Alecu Constantinescu, Romanian trade unionist, journalist and militant (b. 1872)
 Grigoraș Dinicu, Romanian composer (b. 1889)
 March 29 
 Inabata Katsutaro, Japanese industrialist, pioneer (b. 1862)
 Helen Homans, American tennis player (b. 1877)
 March 30
 Friedrich Bergius, German chemist, Nobel Prize laureate (b. 1884)
 Prince Harald of Denmark (b. 1876)

April

 April 1 – Evelyn Owen, Australian gun designer (b. 1915)
 April 2
 George Graves, British comic actor (b. 1876)
 Chandra Mohan, Indian actor (b. 1906)
 Francesco Pasinetti, Italian director, screenwriter (b. 1911)
 April 5 – Hugh Allan, Canadian politician (b. 1865)
 April 6 – Sir Seymour Hicks, British actor (b. 1871)
 April 7 – Mikhail Denisenko, Soviet general (b. 1899)
 April 8 – Santiago Alba y Bonifaz, Spanish lawyer, politician (b. 1872)
 April 13 – Bernardo Ortiz de Montellano, Mexican poet, literary critic, editor and teacher (b. 1899)
 April 15 – Wallace Beery, American actor (b. 1885)
 April 16 – Joseph Augustine Cushman, American geologist, paleontologist and foraminiferologist (b. 1881)
 April 18 – Will Hay, British comic actor (b. 1888)
 April 19
 Guillermo Buitrago, Colombian composer (b. 1920)
 Ulrich Salchow, Swedish figure skater (b. 1877)
 April 22 – Charles Middleton, American actor (b. 1874)
 April 27 – Patrick Lyons, Irish Roman Catholic prelate, reverend (b. 1875)
 April 28
 Ponciano Bernardo, Filipino engineer, politician (b. 1905)
 Aurora Quezon, First Lady of the Philippines (shot) (b. 1888)
 Sir Robert Robertson, British chemist (b. 1869)
 Hla Thaung, Burmese battalion leader
 Sir Fabian Ware, British founder of the Imperial War Graves Commission (b. 1869)
 April 29 
 Johann Jakob Hess, Swiss Egyptologist, Assyriologist (b. 1866)
 Kaarle Knuutila, Finnish farmer, politician (b. 1868)

May

 May 1
 Josep Maria Jujol, Andorran architect (b. 1879)
 Gheorghe Petrașcu, Romanian painter (b. 1872)
 May 4 – Valerio Bacigalupo, Italian goalkeeper (b. 1924)
 May 5 – Hideo Nagata, Japanese poet, playwright (b. 1885)
 May 6 
 Stanisław Grabski, Polish economist, politician (b. 1871)
 Kunihiko Hashimoto, Japanese composer (b. 1904)
 Maurice Maeterlinck, Belgian writer, Nobel Prize in Literature laureate (b. 1862)
 May 9 – Louis II, Prince of Monaco (b. 1870)
 May 10 – Emilio de Gogorza, American baritone (b. 1872)
 May 13 – Sawnie R. Aldredge, American attorney, judge (b. 1890)
 May 19 – Paul Schultze-Naumburg, German architect, painter, publicist and politician (b. 1869)
 May 20 – Damaskinos of Athens, Archbishop of Athens, 57th Prime Minister of Greece (b. 1891)
 May 21 – Klaus Mann, German writer (b. 1906)
 May 22
 Sir Douglas Alexander, 1st Baronet, British-born Canadian industrialist (b. 1864)
 James Forrestal, U.S. Secretary of Navy and Defense (b. 1892)
 Hans Pfitzner, German composer (b. 1869)
 May 23 – Jan Frans De Boever, Belgian painter (b. 1872)
 May 27 – Robert Ripley, American creator of Ripley's Believe It or Not! (b. 1890)
 May 30 – Igor Belkovich, Soviet astronomer (b. 1904)
 Date unknown – Abd Allah Siraj, Prime Minister of Jordan (b. c. 1876)

June

 June 3 – Carlo Angela, Italian doctor (b. 1875)
 June 8 
 Naguib el-Rihani, Egyptian actor (b. 1889)
 Virgilia, Mother Abbess, German Roman Catholic nun and saint (b. 1869)
 June 9 – Maria Cebotari, Romanian soprano, actress (b. 1910)
 June 10
 Filippo Silvestri, Italian entomologist (b. 1873)
 Sigrid Undset, Norwegian writer, Nobel Prize laureate (b. 1882)
 Carl Vaugoin, Austrian politician, 8th Chancellor of Austria (b. 1873)
 June 11 – Giovanni Gioviale, Italian composer (b. 1885)
 June 12 – Maria Candida of the Eucharist, Italian Roman Catholic religious professed and blessed (b. 1884)
 June 14 – Russell Doubleday, American author, publisher (b. 1872)
 June 22 – Robert Boudrioz, French screenwriter, director (b. 1887)
 June 24 – Themistoklis Sofoulis, Greek politician, 3-time Prime Minister of Greece (b. 1860)
 June 25 – Buck Freeman, American baseball player (b. 1871)

July

 July 2 – Georgi Dimitrov, Bulgarian Communist leader, politician and 32nd Prime Minister of Bulgaria (b. 1882)
 July 9 – Fritz Hart, British composer (b. 1874)
 July 11 – Corneliu Dragalina, Romanian general (b. 1887)
 July 12 – Douglas Hyde, Irish academic, linguist and scholar, 1st President of Ireland (b. 1860)
 July 15 
 Anastasios Dalipis, Greek army officer, politician (b. 1896)
 Eva Hubback, British feminist (b. 1886)
 July 18
 Ted Alley, Australian footballer (b. 1881)
 Francisco Javier Arana, Guatemala army officer (b. 1905)
 Vítězslav Novák, Czech composer (b. 1870)
 July 21 – Cesare Formichi, Italian baritone (b. 1883)
 July 23 – Masaharu Anesaki, Japanese scholar (b. 1873)
 July 24
 Nils Östensson, Swedish Olympic cross-country skier (b. 1918)
 Ada Baker, Australian soprano, singing teacher and vaudeville star (b. 1866)
 July 26 – Linda Arvidson, American actress (b. 1884)
 July 27 
 Ellery Harding Clark, American Olympic athlete (b. 1874)
 Maxey Dell Moody, American businessman and founder of M. D. Moody & Sons, Inc. (b. 1883)
 July 29 – József Koszta, Hungarian painter (b. 1861)
 July 30 
 Stoyan Danev, 13th Prime Minister of Bulgaria (b. 1858)
 Albin Andersson, Swedish farmer, manager and politician (b. 1873)
 Vicenta Chávez Orozco, Mexican Roman Catholic religious professed and blessed (b. 1867)
 July 31 – Alfred Bashford, English cricketer (b. 1881)

August

 August 3 – Ignotus, Hungarian editor, writer (b. 1869)
 August 4 – Liberato Pinto, 78th prime minister of Portugal (b. 1880)
 August 5 – Ernest Fourneau, French chemist, pharmacologist (b. 1872)
 August 9
 Gustavus M. Blech, German-born American physician, surgeon (b. 1870)
 Harry Davenport, American actor (b. 1866)
 G. E. M. Skues, British inventor of nymph fly fishing (b. 1858)
 Edward Thorndike, American psychologist (b. 1874)
 August 10 – Homer Burton Adkins, American chemist (b. 1892)
 August 12
 George Cross, Australian actor, director (b. c.1873)
 Al Shean, German-born actor (b. 1868)
 August 14
 Muhsin al-Barazi, Syrian academic, lawyer, politician and 24th Prime Minister of Syria (b. 1904)
 Husni al-Za'im, Syrian military man, politician, 23rd Prime Minister of Syria and 9th President of Syria (b. 1897)
 August 16 
 Ramon Briones Luco, Chilean lawyer, politician (b. 1872)
 Margaret Mitchell, American writer (Gone With the Wind) (b. 1900)
 August 17 – Gregorio Perfecto, Filipino jurist, politician (b. 1891)
 August 18 – Paul Mares, American musician (b. 1900)
 August 20 – Ludwig Halberstädter, German-born Israeli radiologist (b. 1876)
 August 22 – Amado Aguirre Santiago, Mexican general, politician (b. 1863)
 August 23 
 Domingo Díaz Arosemena, Panamian politician, 12th President of Panama (b. 1875)
Herbert Greenfield, Canadian politician, 4th Premier of Alberta (b. 1869)
 August 27 
 Abdulkerim Abbas, Chinese politician (b. 1921)
 Uemura Shōen, Japanese artist (b. 1875)
 August 29 – Franciszek Latinik, Polish general (b. 1864)
 August 30
 Arthur Fielder, English cricketer (b. 1877)
 Hans Kindler, American cellist, conductor (b. 1892)
 Sevasti Qiriazi, Albanian educator, women's rights activist (b. 1871)

September

 September 7 – José Clemente Orozco, Mexican painter (b. 1883)
 September 8 – Richard Strauss, German composer (Also Sprach Zarathustra) (b. 1864)
 September 10 – Wiley Blount Rutledge, U.S. Supreme Court Justice (b. 1894)
 September 12
 Harry Burleigh, American composer (b. 1866)
 Erik Adolf von Willebrand, Finnish physician (b. 1870)
 September 13 
 José Ignacio Cárdenas, Venezuelan diplomat, physician (b. 1874)
 August Krogh, Danish zoophysiologist, recipient of the Nobel Prize in Physiology or Medicine (b. 1874)
 September 14 
 Gottfried Graf von Bismarck-Schönhausen, German Resistance figure (b. 1901)
 Pandeli Evangjeli, Albanian politician, 7th Prime Minister of Albania (b. 1859)
 September 15 – Heinie Beckendorf, American baseball catcher (b. 1884)
 September 16 – Hallie Quinn Brown, African-American educator, writer and activist (b. 1849)
 September 18 – Frank Morgan, American actor (b. 1890)
 September 19
 Will Cuppy, American humorist (b. 1884)
 George Shiels, Irish writer (b. 1886)
 Nikos Skalkottas, Greek composer (b. 1901)
 September 20 – Richard Dix, American actor (b. 1893)
 September 22 – Sam Wood, American director (b. 1883)
 September 24 – Pierre de Bréville, French composer (b. 1861)
 September 25 – Peter Nielsen, Danish actor (b. 1876)
 September 27 – David Adler, American architect (b. 1882)
 September 28
 Archbishop Chrysanthus of Athens (b. 1881)
 Émile Eddé, 4th prime minister, 3rd president of Lebanon (b. 1886)

October

 October 1 
 Nykyta Budka, Soviet Roman Catholic bishop, martyr and blessed (b. 1877)
 Buddy Clark, American pop singer (b. 1912)
 October 2 – Luis Armiñán Pérez, Spanish politician (b. 1871)
 October 4 – Federico Beltrán Masses, Spanish painter (b. 1885)
 October 5 – Yoshio Kodaira, Japanese rapist, serial killer (executed) (b. 1905)
 October 6 
 Metropolitan Timotheos of Australia, Greek Orthodox priest, bishop (b. 1880)
 Robert Wilson Lynd, Irish journalist and writer (b. 1879)
 October 7 – Matiu Ratana, New Zealand politician (b. 1912)
 October 8 – Gheorghe Mironescu, Romanian politician, 33rd Prime Minister of Romania (b. 1874)
 October 9 – Emanuele Foà, Italian engineer, physicist (b. 1892)
 October 14 
 Fritz Leiber, American actor (b. 1882)
 Roman Lysko, Soviet Roman Catholic and Orthodox priest, martyr and blessed (b. 1914)
 October 15
 Elmer Clifton, American actor, director (b. 1890)
 László Rajk, Hungarian Communist politician, former Foreign Minister (executed) (b. 1909)
 Jacques Copeau, French actor, producer, director and dramatist (b. 1879)
 October 17 – Aurel Aldea, Romanian general and politician (b. 1887)
 October 21 – Laura of Saint Catherine of Siena, Colombian Roman Catholic religious professed and saint (b. 1874)
 October 22 – Craig Reynolds, American actor (b. 1907)
 October 23 
 Almanzo Wilder, American writer, husband of Laura Ingalls Wilder (b. 1857)
 John Robert Clynes, British trade unionist, Labour politician (b. 1869)
 October 27 
 František Halas, Czechoslovakian essayist, poet and translator (b. 1901)
 Ginette Neveu, French violinist (b. 1919)
 October 28 
 Marcel Cerdan, French professional boxer (killed in plane crash) (b. 1916)
 Patriarch Guregh Israelian of Jerusalem (b. 1894)
 October 29
George Gurdjieff, Soviet spiritual teacher (b. 1866)
 Chikuhei Nakajima, Japanese naval officer, engineer, and politician, founder of the Nakajima Aircraft Company (b. 1884)
 October 31
 Jindřich Bišický, Czechoslovakian author (b. 1889)
 Lorenzo Massa, Argentine Roman Catholic priest and blessed (b. 1882)
 Edward Stettinius, Jr., U.S. Secretary of State (b. 1900)

November

 November – María Josepha Sophia de Iturbide, head of the Imperial House of Mexico (b. 1872)
 November 3
 William Desmond, Irish actor (b. 1878)
 Solomon R. Guggenheim, American philanthropist (b. 1861)
 November 4 – Walther von Bonstetten, Swiss Boy Scout Association member (b. 1867)
 November 5 – Abdolhossein Hazhir, 54th Prime Minister of Iran (b. 1899)
 November 8 – August Hagenbach, Swiss physicist (b. 1871)
 November 11
 Mun Bhuridatta, Thai Buddhist monk (b. 1870)
 Prince Carlos of Bourbon-Two Sicilies (b. 1870)
 Ignatius Stelletskii, Soviet archaeologist, historian and researcher (b. 1878)
November 12 - Walter Buch, German SS general (b. 1883)
 November 15 – Nathuram Godse, assassin of Mohandas Gandhi (b. 1910), and his accomplice, Narayan Apte (b. 1911)
 November 19 – James Ensor, Belgian painter (b. 1860)
 November 23 – Prince Ludwig Ferdinand of Bavaria (b. 1859)
 November 25 
 Mizuno Rentarō, Japanese statesman, politician and cabinet minister (b. 1868)
 Bill Robinson, African-American dancer (b. 1878)
 November 27
 Charles F. Haanel, American New Thought author and businessman (b. 1866)
 Vincenzo Irolli, Italian painter (b. 1860)
 Martin Benno Schmidt, German pathologist (b. 1863)
 November 30 – Dame Irene Vanbrugh, British actress (b. 1872)

December

 December 3
 Philip Barry, American playwright (b. 1896)
 Maria Ouspenskaya, Soviet actress, acting teacher (b. 1876)
 December 5 – Arthur Bedford, British navy officer (b. 1881)
 December 6 
 Lead Belly, African-American blues musician (b. 1888)
 José María Zeledón Brenes, Costa Rican politician, poet, writer and journalist (b. 1877)
 December 7 
 Rex Beach, American novelist, playwright and Olympic water polo player (b. 1877)
 Stanislas Blanchard, Canadian politician (b. 1871)
 December 8 – George Barnes, Australian businessman, politician (b. 1856)
 December 11 
 Krishna Chandra Bhattacharya, Indian philosopher (b. 1875)
 Marian Grzybowski, Polish dermatologist (b. 1895)
 December 16 
 Sidney Olcott, Canadian film director (b. 1873)
 Lee White, American actor (b. 1888)
 December 22 – Manuel Camus, Filipino lawyer, politician (b. 1875)
 December 23
 Arthur Eichengrün, German chemist (b. 1867)
 Felix Kaufmann, Austrian-born American philosopher (b. 1895)
 December 24 – Gertrude Bacon, British aeronautical pioneer (b. 1874)
 December 25 – Leon Schlesinger, American producer, filmmaker (b. 1884)
 December 26 – Julius Brandt, Austrian actor (b. 1873)
 December 27 – Antoni Ponikowski, Polish academician, politician and 7th Prime Minister of Poland (b. 1878)
 December 28
 Hervey Allen, American author (b. 1889)
 Jack Lovelock, New Zealand Olympic athlete (b. 1910)
 December 30 – Leopold IV, Prince of Lippe (b. 1871)
 December 31
 Josef Maria Auchentaller, Austrian architect, painter, draftsman and printmaker (b. 1865)
 Raimond Valgre, Estonian composer, musician (b. 1913)

Date unknown
 Tuan Guru Haji Ahmad, Indonesian ulama (b. 1885)
 Constantin Atanasescu, Romanian general (b. 1885)
 Abd Allah Siraj, Prime Minister of Jordan (b. 1876)
 Ernest Spybuck, Native American artist (b. 1883)
 Zhang Haipeng, Chinese and Manchukuoan general (executed) (b. 1867)

Nobel Prizes

 Physics – Yukawa Hideki
 Chemistry – William Francis Giauque
 Medicine – Walter Rudolf Hess and António Caetano de Abreu Freire Egas Moniz
 Literature – William Faulkner
 Peace – John Boyd Orr

References